Salt Creek Township is a township in Chautauqua County, Kansas, USA.  As of the 2000 census, its population was 123.

Geography
According to the USGS, it contains three cemeteries: Hale, Hardrock (Latitude: 37.19890, Longitude: -96.02670) and West Liberty.

The streams of Coffey Branch and Pan Creek run through this township.

Transportation
Salt Creek Township contains one airport or landing strip, Rupp Airport.

References
 USGS Geographic Names Information System (GNIS)

External links
 US-Counties.com
 City-Data.com

Townships in Chautauqua County, Kansas
Townships in Kansas